Nicholas "True" Sweetser (born October 14, 1997) is an American swimmer. He competed in the men's 1500 metre freestyle event at the 2017 World Aquatics Championships.

References

External links
 

1997 births
Living people
American male swimmers
Place of birth missing (living people)
Pan American Games silver medalists for the United States
Pan American Games medalists in swimming
Swimmers at the 2019 Pan American Games
Medalists at the 2019 Pan American Games